Jamie Sue Weiss is a make-up artist in television and films. She is the older sister to actor Michael T. Weiss.

Filmography - Make-Up Department

Film 
Net Worth (2000) (key makeup artist)
While You Were Sleeping (1995) (makeup artist) (uncredited)
Miracle on 34th Street (1994) (makeup artist)
Uncle Buck (1989) (additional makeup artist)

Television 
ER (1994) TV Series (key makeup artist: Chicago)
Chicago Hope (1994) TV Series (key makeup artist: Chicago)

External links
 
 Jamie Sue Weiss @ TV.com formerly TVTome.com
 Jamie Weiss Make-up artist for television, film & print

American make-up artists
Artists from Chicago
Living people
Year of birth missing (living people)